Arignano (Piedmontese: Argnan) is a comune (municipality) in the Metropolitan City of Turin in the Italian region Piedmont, located about  east of Turin.

It is home to two castles, the Rocca (or Castello Superiore, known from 1047, and enlarged in the 15th century after its sack by Facino Cane's troops) and the Castello Inferiore (15th century).

Lake Arignano is located in the comune.

Twin towns

 Comillas, Spain

References

Cities and towns in Piedmont
Castles in Italy